The FIL European Luge Natural Track Championships, part of the International Luge Federation (FIL), have taken place since 1970. A team event was added for the 2010 championships. For information on luge championships in Europe that have been contested since 1914, please see FIL European Luge Championships.

Host cities
1970: Kapfenberg, Austria
1971: Vandans, Austria
1973: Taisten, Italy
1974: Niedernsill, Austria
1975: Feld am See, Austria
1977: Seis am Schlern, Italy
1978: Aurach, Austria
1979: Aosta, Italy
1981: Niedernsill, Austria
1983: St. Konrad, Austria
1985: Szczyrk, Poland
1987: Jesenice, Yugoslavia
1989: Garmisch-Partenkirchen, West Germany
1991: Völs am Schlern, Italy
1993: Stein an der Enns, Austria
1995: Kandalaksha, Russia
1997: Passiria, Italy
1999: Szczyrk, Poland
2002: Frantschach, Austria
2004: Hüttau, Austria
2006: Umhausen, Austria
2008: Olang, Italy
2010: Sankt Sebastian, Austria
2012: Nouvoralsk, Russia
2014: Umhausen, Austria
2016: Passeiertal, Italy
2018: Winterleiten, Austria
2020: Moscow, Russia

Men's singles
Debuted: 1970

Women's singles
Debuted: 1970

Men's doubles
Debuted: 1970

Team event
Debuted: 2010.

Medal table
As of the 2010 FIL European Luge Natural Track Championships.

References
Men's doubles natural track European champions
Men's singles natural track European champions
Women's singles natural track European champions

 
Natural track luge competitions
Recurring sporting events established in 1970